Walter Augustus Kendall also known as Joe Kendall (1882–1958) was an Australian rugby league footballer who played in the 1900s and 1910s.  He played for North Sydney in the NSWRL competition and was a foundation player of the club.

Background
Kendall was born in St Leonards, New South Wales on 26 April 1882.

Playing career
Kendall played in North Sydney's first ever game against South Sydney on April 20 1908 at Birchgrove Oval.

Kendall played representative football with Australia in 1909 featuring in 1 game.  Kendall also played 1 game for Metropolis in 1908.

Kendall played with Norths until the end of 1910 before retiring from rugby league.

References

North Sydney Bears players
Rugby league players from Sydney
Rugby league hookers
Rugby league locks
Rugby league props
1882 births
1958 deaths
Place of death missing